Aalapot is a village and former Village Development Committee that is now part of Kageshwari-Manohara Municipality in Kathmandu District in Bagmati Province of central Nepal. At the time of the 2011 Nepal census it had a population of 3,159 and had 671 houses in it.

Aalapot is located near Sundarijal, Bhadrabas and Gokarna, north east of Kathmandu.

References

Populated places in Kathmandu District